Phenomenon is a 1996 American romantic fantasy drama film directed by Jon Turteltaub, written by Gerald Di Pego, and starring John Travolta, Kyra Sedgwick, Forest Whitaker, Robert Duvall, and Jeffrey DeMunn.

In the film, an amiable, small-town everyman is inexplicably transformed into a genius with telekinetic powers. The original music score was composed by Thomas Newman.

Plot
George Malley is a kind, average man who works as an auto mechanic in a small town in Northern California. George has a crush on a single mother in town, Lace. He lets her sell her handmade chairs at his shop, but he secretly buys them and keeps them at his house. She is very closed off and rebuffs George's advances. After celebrating his 37th birthday at a local bar with his best friend, Nate, and father figure, Doc Brunder, he notices a ball of shining bright white lights in the sky. It grows closer and appears to hit him, making a loud sound and knocking him down. Nobody else saw the lights or heard the sound.

George begins to exhibit remarkable levels of intelligence. He easily absorbs vast amounts of information, formulates new, revolutionary ideas, and develops telekinesis. Not needing sleep, he spends each night reading multiple books.

George tries to use his new intelligence for the good of his community. He develops a powerful fertilizer, improves solar panel designs, and predicts an earthquake without any equipment. When Doc is called to aid a sick Portuguese man, George learns the language in minutes and helps translate. He then uses his telekinesis to rescue the man's young relative. George also sets a plan to help Nate get together with Ella, the mother of the Portuguese boy he rescued. Nate has a shortwave radio hobby. While visiting him, George decodes and responds to a signal, though Nate asks him to forget about it out of fear that they might be picking up information from a nearby air force base.

The townsfolk become wary, but George finds support from Doc, Nate and from a growing relationship with Lace, and her children, Al and Glory. George invites Lace to join him on a trip to UC Berkeley to meet with seismologist Professor Ringold about George's earthquake prediction. Before he can go, the FBI takes George and Nate into custody over his code-breaking. He breaks more codes, then astounds Dr. Nierdof by answering a series of difficult quizzes and exams, and shows him his telekinesis. When George threatens to talk to the press, he is finally released. The FBI instructs Dr. Ringold not to let George meet with anyone at Berkeley.

Returning to the local bar, George becomes frustrated with friends' questions about his abilities, and he causes a large mirror to break via telekinesis.

Lace visits him to provide a shave and a haircut. Their innocent intimacy scares her since she has tried so hard to not like him, but it encourages him to stop avoiding the townsfolk. He goes to the county fair to ease fear with a demonstration of his powers, but the crowd goes into a frenzy, demanding his attention and his perceived healing powers. George is knocked to the ground, where he again sees the flashing balls of light before losing consciousness.

George awakens in a hospital. With Lace and Nate there for support, Doc explains that George has a deadly brain tumor. This has caused the lights and stimulated George's phenomenal brain functions. They have called Dr. Wellin, a leading brain surgeon, to see if an operation can save George's life. Dr. Wellin determines there is only a 1 in 500 chance of survival but wants to proceed with an invasive operation solely to do research on George's living brain. When George refuses, saying he still has work to do, the doctor has him declared mentally unfit and held against his will.

George escapes from the hospital and returns home. He spends time with Nate, then goes to Lace's to spend time with her and her children. The FBI agent shows up, but Lace persuades him to let George die in peace.

Professor Ringold arrives at Lace's house, only to learn that he is too late. Lace gives him George's research materials, so he can finish George's breakthrough work.

A year later, George's friends are gathered for what would have been his 38th birthday. Nate, now fluent in Portuguese, is married to a pregnant Ella. Other signs of George's phenomenal impact on the town and its people are seen all around.

Cast
 John Travolta as George Malley
 Kyra Sedgwick as Lace Pennamin
 Forest Whitaker as Nate Pope
 Robert Duvall as Doc Brunder
 Jeffrey DeMunn as Prof. John Ringold
 Richard Kiley as Dr. Wellin
 David Gallagher as Al Pennamin
 Ashley Buccille as Glory Pennamin
 Brent Spiner as Dr. Bob Nierdof
 Elisabeth Nunziato as Ella

Reception

Box office
The film grossed more than $16,000,000 on its opening weekend, debuting in third position and later climbing up to second. It finally grossed $104,636,382 in the US and $47,400,000 elsewhere, grossing approximately $152,000,000 overall.

Critical
On Rotten Tomatoes, the film has an approval rating of 49% based on reviews from 37 critics, with an average rating of 5.9/10. On Metacritic, it has a score of 41% based on reviews from 17 critics, indicating "mixed or average reviews". Audiences polled by CinemaScore gave the film an average grade of "A-" on an A+ to F scale.

Roger Ebert of The Chicago Sun Times gave the film three out of four stars, questioning if it could have been more challenging but remarking, "But that's not what it's about. It's about change, acceptance and love, and it rounds those three bases very nicely, even if it never quite gets to home."

Janet Maslin of The New York Times, complimented the concept but said "during the grimness of the film's final half hour, jaws may drop. A whopping wrong turn throws this lightweight, benign-looking movie terminally off course." Empire magazine's Angie Errigo rated the film three out of five stars. She complained about the film's tendency to overexplain itself, but complimented Travolta's performance.

Accolades
Travolta and Whitaker both won a Blockbuster Entertainment Award for their performances in 1997. Whitaker also received an Image Award. In the same year the film was nominated for a Saturn Award. Travolta was nominated for an MTV Movie Award for his performance, as well as for Best Kiss with Kyra Sedgwick. Eric Clapton was nominated for his song "Change the World" and won an ASCAP Award and the BMI Film & TV Award. Thomas Newman also received a BMI Film & TV Award for the score.

Television sequel
A sequel-remake, titled Phenomenon II, was developed for television as part of The Wonderful World of Disney series (1995–2005). The film was released in Season 48, Episode 3 and aired November 1, 2003. The TV movie was directed by Ken Olin and written by Gerald Di Pego. The movie stars:
 Christopher Shyer as George Malley
 Terry O'Quinn as Secret Service Agent
 Jill Clayburgh as Norma Malley
 Peter Coyote as John Ringold
 Ty Olsson as Frank Pierce
 Gina Tognoni as Police Officer Claire

Trivia
The movie was filmed in Auburn, California.

See also
 Phenomenon (soundtrack), a compilation album of music from the film

References

External links

 
 
 
  (the Made-for-TV remake)

1996 films
1996 fantasy films
1996 romantic drama films
1990s American films
1990s English-language films
1990s fantasy drama films
1990s romantic fantasy films
American fantasy drama films
American romantic drama films
American romantic fantasy films
Films about telekinesis
Films directed by Jon Turteltaub
Films scored by Thomas Newman
Films set in California
Films shot in California
Touchstone Pictures films